The Calgary Indoor is a defunct professional men's tennis tournament that was part of the USLTA Indoor Circuit from 1973–1974. The event was held at the Glenmore Racquet Club in Calgary, Alberta, Canada and was played on indoor carpet courts.

Finals

Singles

Doubles

References

External links
 1973 tournament results (ATP)
 1974 tournament results (ATP)

ATP Tour
Defunct tennis tournaments in Canada
Tennis in Alberta
Carpet court tennis tournaments